Dandenong Stadium is an Australian sports and entertainment centre in Dandenong, Victoria. The stadium is home to the WNBL's Southside Flyers, the Dandenong Basketball Association and Volleyball Victoria.

References

Basketball venues in Australia
Dandenong Rangers
Sports venues completed in 1992
Sports venues in Melbourne
Volleyball venues in Australia
Buildings and structures in the City of Greater Dandenong
Sport in the City of Greater Dandenong
1992 establishments in Australia
Indoor arenas in Australia